was a Japanese basketball player. He competed in the men's tournament at the 1956 Summer Olympics.

References

External links
 

1934 births
1978 deaths
Japanese men's basketball players
Olympic basketball players of Japan
Basketball players at the 1956 Summer Olympics
Place of birth missing